Milton Francis Bocek (July 16, 1912 – April 29, 2007) was a professional baseball outfielder. He played parts of two seasons for the Chicago White Sox of Major League Baseball (MLB).

Early life
Bocek was born in Chicago, Illinois, and was popularly known as "Beltin' Bo from Cicero". He graduated from Crane High School (Chicago) in Chicago and played college baseball at the University of Wisconsin–Madison.

Professional career
While Bocek was a student at the University of Wisconsin–Madison, he became a fairly prominent summer amateur and semipro player in baseball and softball. Chicago White Sox manager Lew Fonseca noticed him and arranged a tryout at Comiskey Park, during which Bocek hit several balls into the upper deck. He signed with the White Sox in the second half of 1933, becoming the fifth-youngest player in Major League Baseball that season, and then spent the first part of the 1934 season with the team as well. Subsequently, he played several years in the minor league systems of the St. Louis Cardinals and the New York Yankees.

Post-playing career
After the end of Bocek's playing career, he worked as a draftsman for Danly Machine Company and later at a family owned business, also serving in the United States Army during World War II. He was married to his wife Victoria for 58 years before her death in 2006, and they had three children and eight grandchildren. At the time of his death, he held the distinction of being the oldest living White Sox player. He died on April 29, 2007, in Brookfield, Illinois, after a brief illness. He is buried next to his wife at Queen of Heaven Cemetery in Hillside, Illinois.

References

External links 
, or Baseball Almanac

1912 births
2007 deaths
Major League Baseball left fielders
Chicago White Sox players
Longview Cannibals players
Elmira Red Wings players
Columbus Red Birds players
Sacramento Senators players
Dallas Steers players
Cedar Rapids Raiders players
Kansas City Blues players
Binghamton Triplets players
Decatur Commodores players
Asheville Tourists players
Gastonia Cardinals players
Wisconsin Badgers men's basketball players
Burials in Illinois
Baseball players from Chicago
People from Brookfield, Illinois
United States Army personnel of World War II